The 60th parallel north is a circle of latitude that is 60 degrees north of Earth's equator. It crosses Europe, Asia, the Pacific Ocean, North America, and the Atlantic Ocean.

Although it lies approximately twice as far away from the Equator as from the North Pole, the 60th parallel is half as long as the Equator line, due to the cosine of 60 degrees being 0.5. This is where the Earth bulges halfway as much as on the Equator.

At this latitude, the Sun is visible for 18 hours, 52 minutes during the June solstice and 5 hours, 52 minutes during the December solstice.
The maximum altitude of the Sun is 53.44° on 21 June and 6.56° on 21 December.
The maximum altitude of the Sun is > 15.00º in October and > 8.00º in November. 

The lowest latitude where white nights can be observed is approximately on this parallel.

Around the world
Starting at the Prime Meridian and heading eastwards, the parallel 60° north passes through:

{| class="wikitable plainrowheaders sortable"
! scope="col" width="125" | Co-ordinates
! scope="col" | Country, territory or ocean
! scope="col" | Notes
|-
| style="background:#b0e0e6;" | 
! scope="row" style="background:#b0e0e6;" | Atlantic Ocean
| style="background:#b0e0e6;" | North Sea
|-
| 
! scope="row" | 
| Islands of Stolmen and Selbjørn, Hordaland
|-
| style="background:#b0e0e6;" | 
! scope="row" style="background:#b0e0e6;" | Atlantic Ocean
| style="background:#b0e0e6;" | Bekkjarviksundet, Selbjørnsfjorden, North Sea
|-
| 
! scope="row" | 
| Island of Huftarøy, Hordaland
|-
| style="background:#b0e0e6;" | 
! scope="row" style="background:#b0e0e6;" | Atlantic Ocean
| style="background:#b0e0e6;" | Langenuen, North Sea
|-
| 
! scope="row" | 
| Islands of Reksteren, Tysnesøy and the mainland Hordaland
|-
| style="background:#b0e0e6;" | 
! scope="row" style="background:#b0e0e6;" | Atlantic Ocean
| style="background:#b0e0e6;" | Hardangerfjorden, North Sea
|-
| 
! scope="row" | 
| Mainland: Folgefonna glacier, Telemark, Buskerud, Akershus, Oslo, Hedmark, ØstfoldPassing just north of the capital Oslo
|-
| 
! scope="row" | 
| Passing through Fagersta Passing just north of Uppsala
|-
| style="background:#b0e0e6;" | 
! scope="row" style="background:#b0e0e6;" | Atlantic Ocean
| style="background:#b0e0e6;" | Baltic Sea
|-
| 
! scope="row" | 
| Högskär, Bäckö and several smaller islands, 
|-
| style="background:#b0e0e6;" | 
! scope="row" style="background:#b0e0e6;" | Atlantic Ocean
| style="background:#b0e0e6;" | Baltic Sea
|-
| 
! scope="row" style="background:#b0e0e6;" | 
| Passing through Tammisaari 
|-
| style="background:#b0e0e6;" | 
! scope="row" style="background:#b0e0e6;" | Atlantic Ocean
| style="background:#b0e0e6;" | Baltic SeaPassing just south of Helsinki, 
|-
| 
! scope="row" | 
| Porkkala peninsula
|-
| style="background:#b0e0e6;" | 
! scope="row" style="background:#b0e0e6;" | Atlantic Ocean
| style="background:#b0e0e6;" | Gulf of Finland, Baltic SeaPassing just south of the island of Gogland, 
|-
| 
! scope="row" | 
| Moshchny Island
|-
| style="background:#b0e0e6;" | 
! scope="row" style="background:#b0e0e6;" | Atlantic Ocean
| style="background:#b0e0e6;" | Gulf of Finland, Baltic Sea
|-
| 
! scope="row" | 
| Island of Kotlin (city of Kronstadt)
|-
| style="background:#b0e0e6;" | 
! scope="row" style="background:#b0e0e6;" | Atlantic Ocean
| style="background:#b0e0e6;" | Gulf of Finland, Baltic Sea
|-
| 
! scope="row" | 
| Passing through Saint Petersburg, Lake Ladoga
|-
| style="background:#b0e0e6;" | 
! scope="row" style="background:#b0e0e6;" | Pacific Ocean
| style="background:#b0e0e6;" | Shelikhov Gulf, Sea of Okhotsk
|-
| 
! scope="row" | 
| Kamchatka Peninsula
|-
| style="background:#b0e0e6;" | 
! scope="row" style="background:#b0e0e6;" | Pacific Ocean
| style="background:#b0e0e6;" | Bering Sea
|-
| 
! scope="row" | 
|Pylgin Range
|-
| style="background:#b0e0e6;" | 
! scope="row" style="background:#b0e0e6;" | Pacific Ocean
| style="background:#b0e0e6;" |  Olyutor Gulf, Bering Sea
|-
| 
! scope="row" | 
| Olyutor Peninsula
|-
| style="background:#b0e0e6;" | 
! scope="row" style="background:#b0e0e6;" | Pacific Ocean
| style="background:#b0e0e6;" | Bering Sea
|-
| 
! scope="row" | 
| Alaska - Nunivak Island
|-
| style="background:#b0e0e6;" | 
! scope="row" style="background:#b0e0e6;" | Pacific Ocean
| style="background:#b0e0e6;" | Etolin Strait, Bering Sea
|-
| 
! scope="row" | 
| Alaska
|-
| style="background:#b0e0e6;" | 
! scope="row" style="background:#b0e0e6;" | Pacific Ocean
| style="background:#b0e0e6;" | Cook Inlet, Gulf of Alaska
|-
| 
! scope="row" | 
| Alaska - Kenai Peninsula, Evans Island, Elrington Island, Latouche Island and Montague Island
|-
| style="background:#b0e0e6;" | 
! scope="row" style="background:#b0e0e6;" | Pacific Ocean
| style="background:#b0e0e6;" | Gulf of Alaska
|-
| 
! scope="row" | 
| Alaska - Wingham Island, Kayak Island and a small section of mainland
|-
| style="background:#b0e0e6;" | 
! scope="row" style="background:#b0e0e6;" | Pacific Ocean
| style="background:#b0e0e6;" | Gulf of Alaska
|-
| 
! scope="row" | 
| Alaska
|-
| 
! scope="row" | 
| Yukon / British Columbia border Northwest Territories / British Columbia border Northwest Territories / Alberta border - passes through Wood Buffalo National Park and beside Fort Smith, NT Northwest Territories / Saskatchewan border Nunavut / Manitoba border
|-
| style="background:#b0e0e6;" | 
! scope="row" style="background:#b0e0e6;" | Arctic Ocean
| style="background:#b0e0e6;" | Hudson BayPassing just north of the Ottawa Islands, Nunavut, 
|-
| 
! scope="row" | 
| QuebecPassing just south of Puvirnituq, Quebec
|-
| style="background:#b0e0e6;" | 
! scope="row" style="background:#b0e0e6;" | Arctic Ocean
| style="background:#b0e0e6;" | Ungava BayPassing just south of Kangirsuk, Quebec, 
|-valign="top"
| 
! scope="row" | 
| Quebec, Newfoundland and Labrador
|-
| style="background:#b0e0e6;" | 
! scope="row" style="background:#b0e0e6;" | Atlantic Ocean
| style="background:#b0e0e6;" | Border between the Davis Strait (to the north) and the Labrador Sea (to the south)
|-
| 
! scope="row" | 
|Passing just south of Narsaq
|-
| style="background:#b0e0e6;" | 
! scope="row" style="background:#b0e0e6;" | Atlantic Ocean
| style="background:#b0e0e6;" |
|-
| 
! scope="row" | 
| Islands of Mainland and Mousa, Shetland Islands, 
|-
| style="background:#b0e0e6;" | 
! scope="row" style="background:#b0e0e6;" | Atlantic Ocean
| style="background:#b0e0e6;" | North Sea
|}

Canada

In Canada, the 60th parallel forms the southern mainland boundary of the northern territories of Yukon, Northwest Territories, and Nunavut with the western provinces of British Columbia, Alberta, Saskatchewan, and Manitoba.

Accordingly, "north of 60" is an expression often used for the territories, although parts of Nunavut (the islands in Hudson Bay and James Bay) are located south of the 60th parallel, and parts of Quebec and Newfoundland and Labrador are located north, to the east of Hudson Bay. A 1990s TV show on CBC about life in the Northwest Territories was called North of 60.

Canada's only four corners are located at the intersection of the 60th parallel and the 102nd meridian west, between the Northwest Territories, Nunavut, Saskatchewan, and Manitoba.

Greenland
Between 1776 and 1950, the 60th parallel formed the southern limit of the Royal Greenland Trade Department's exclusive monopoly on trade near the Dano-Norwegian and later Danish colonies of Greenland (1776–1782) and South Greenland (1782–1950).

See also
58th parallel north
59th parallel north
61st parallel north
60th parallel south

References

n60
Borders of Yukon
Borders of the Northwest Territories
Borders of Nunavut
Borders of British Columbia
Borders of Alberta
Borders of Saskatchewan
Borders of Manitoba